The Fire Safety Museum of Taipei City Fire Department is a museum on firefighting in Neihu District, Taipei, Taiwan.

History
The museum was built in response to the Great Hanshin earthquake in Japan on 17 January 1995 to teach people what to do during a natural disaster. On 10 July 1995, the newly restructured Taipei City Fire Department planned to build Taiwan's first fire safety museum aiming to build awareness among the public about the danger of natural disaster. The museum was opened in November 1998.

Architecture
The museum spans over 5 floors. The first floor consists of the introduction area, children's safety training classroom, questions and answers complex assessment area, storeroom and 3D scenes. The second floor consists of storm simulation area, disaster prevention information room, earthquake virtual reality escape game area and household railed window demonstration area. The third floor consists of quake simulation area, sunshine digital interactive show and CPR training area. The fourth floor consists of fire prevention education, smoke experience area and community safety classroom. The tenth floor consists of multimedia room and fire fighting museum.

Transportation
The museum is accessible within walking distance south from Wende Station of the Taipei Metro.

See also
 List of museums in Taiwan
 Fire museum

References

External links
 

1998 establishments in Taiwan
Firefighting museums in Taiwan
Museums established in 1998
Museums in Taipei